Anomaloglossus ayarzaguenai (in Spanish: sapito ninera de Ayarzaguena) is a species of frog in the family Aromobatidae. It is endemic to Venezuela where it is known from Cerro Jaua in Bolívar state. It is common on the top of this tepui where it is found on the margins of streams and in the surrounding forest.

The only known population's home is in a protected area; formerly in Jaua-Sarisariñama National Park the habitat in question and the rest of Jaua-Sarisariñama was included within a new national park Caura National Park in 2017.

References

ayarzaguenai
Amphibians of Venezuela
Endemic fauna of Venezuela
Taxonomy articles created by Polbot
Amphibians described in 1996
Taxa named by Enrique La Marca
Amphibians of the Tepuis